Nicola Willis (born 13 March 1985 in Southend-on-Sea) is a former British female artistic gymnast. She represented Great Britain at the 2004 Summer Olympics in Athens. She also competed for England at the 2002 Commonwealth Games. At the 2004 European Women's Artistic Gymnastics Championships she finished with the British team 5th in the team event.

After retiring from competitive gymnastics, she joined Cirque Du Soleil and performed with them on Cirque Du Soleil shows Saltimbanco and La Nouba.

References

External links
 
 
 

1985 births
Living people
British female artistic gymnasts
English female artistic gymnasts
Olympic gymnasts of Great Britain
Gymnasts at the 2004 Summer Olympics
Commonwealth Games medallists in gymnastics
Commonwealth Games silver medallists for England
Gymnasts at the 2002 Commonwealth Games
Sportspeople from Southend-on-Sea
Medallists at the 2002 Commonwealth Games